Dilek Kınık (born 1995 in Ankara, Turkey) is a Turkish female volleyball player. She plays for Vakıfbank Spor Kulübü and wears the number 1.

Clubs 
  VakıfBank Güneş Sigorta Türk Telekom (2010- )

Awards

Clubs 
 2012-13 Turkish Cup -  Champion, with Vakıfbank Spor Kulübü
 2012–13 CEV Champions League -  Champion, with Vakıfbank Spor Kulübü
 2012-13 Turkish Women's Volleyball League -  Champion, with Vakıfbank Spor Kulübü

See also 
 Turkish women in sports

References 

1995 births
Living people
Turkish women's volleyball players
VakıfBank S.K. volleyballers